The Journal of Paediatrics and Child Health is a bimonthly peer-reviewed medical journal covering pediatrics. It was established in 1965 as the Australian Paediatric Journal, obtaining its current name in 1990. It is published by John Wiley & Sons on behalf of the Royal Australasian College of Physicians' Paediatrics and Child Health Division, of which it is the official journal. The editor-in-chief is David Isaacs (University of Sydney). According to the Journal Citation Reports, the journal has a 2020 impact factor of 1.954, ranking it 80th out of 129 journals in the category "Pediatrics".

References

External links

Publications established in 1965
Wiley (publisher) academic journals
English-language journals
Pediatrics journals
Bimonthly journals